Mojtaba Ensafi (June 6, 1982) is an Iranian football defender.

References

External links
 Mojtaba Ensafi at Persian League
 

Iranian footballers
Living people
Esteghlal F.C. players
Bargh Shiraz players
Shirin Faraz Kermanshah players
Sanat Mes Kerman F.C. players
F.C. Aboomoslem players
Malavan players
1982 births
Association football defenders
21st-century Iranian people